Coleophora patzaki is a moth of the family Coleophoridae that is endemic to Greece.

References

External links

patzaki
Moths described in 1983
Moths of Europe
Endemic fauna of Greece